Chlamydoabsidia is a genus of fungi belonging to the family Cunninghamellaceae.

Species:
 Chlamydoabsidia padenii Hesselt. & J.J.Ellis

References

Fungi